The CSS-12 was a prototype Polish twin-engined feederliner of the 1950s. A single example was built and flown in 1950, but no production followed.

Design and development
The German invasion of Poland at the start of the Second World War resulted in the destruction of Poland's aviation industry, and following the end of the war the Polish government decided to re-establish a national aviation industry. Two design bureaus were set up to design and develop prototypes, Lotnicze Warsztaty Doświadczalne (LWD) (Aircraft Experimental Workshops) at Łódź and the Centralne Studium Samolotów (C.S.S.) (Central Aircraft Study) based at Warsaw, with production to be carried out at a series of State Aircraft Factories (PZL). The C.S.S., led by Franciszek Misztal, who worked as a designer in the pre-war PZL, was tasked with the design of three types, the CSS-10, a single-engined primary trainer, an aerobatic trainer, the CSS-11 and a twin-engined feederliner, which was designated CSS-12.

Work on the CSS-12 began in 1948, with the prototype making its maiden flight on 22 November 1950. It was a twin-engined low-wing cantilever monoplane of all-metal construction, the first all-metal aircraft to be built in Poland following the end of the Second World War. The oval section fuselage accommodated seats for ten passengers in two rows of five, with the two pilots sitting in an enclosed flight deck forward of the passenger cabin, while a cloakroom and baggage compartment aft of the cabin. The aircraft's wings featured a mixture of smooth and corrugated duralumin skinning, with the corrugated sections covered in fabric to reduce drag. Full-span hydraulically operated trailing-edge flaps were fitted, while engine exhaust gas was used to de-ice the wings' leading edge. The aircraft was fitted with a retractable nosewheel undercarriage. Two  Argus As 411 engines, built in Germany during the war, drove two-bladed constant speed propellers.

At the end of 1950, the Polish aviation industry was re-organised, with large orders being placed for license-production of Soviet Mikoyan–Gurevich MiG-15 jet fighters. As part of this reorganisation, LWD and the CSS were disbanded, and work on the CSS-12 was suspended. In 1955 flight testing of the CSS-12 resumed. Instead, the CSS-12 formed the basis of the larger four-engined PZL MD-12 airliner which made its first flight in 1959.

Specifications

Notes

References

1950s Polish airliners
Twin piston-engined tractor aircraft
Low-wing aircraft
Aircraft first flown in 1950